Kenan Hot (born March 16, 2004) is an American soccer player who plays as a midfielder for the Duke Blue Devils.

Career
Hot joined New York Red Bulls in December 2018.

During 2020 Hot appeared for the club's USL Championship side New York Red Bulls II. He made his debut starting in a 3–2 loss against Philadelphia Union II on August 6, 2020.

During the summer of 2021, Hot began playing with amateur side FC Motown in both the National Premier Soccer League and in the team's inaugural USL League Two season.

On July 30, 2021, Hot signed an academy contract with USL Championship side Hartford Athletic. Hot scored his first professional goal on October 10, 2021 in Hartford's 4-3 loss to Charleston Battery.

Hot committed to playing college soccer at Duke University, playing for the Blue Devils from Fall 2022.

International career
Hot was a member of the United States U15 and was invited to camp with United States U17 prior to Covid causing the cancellation of the entire cycle.

Personal
Kenan is the cousin of former professional soccer player Šaćir Hot, who also played with New York Red Bulls. Šaćir also coached Kenan during the summer of 2021 while the latter played for FC Motown in the NPSL.

Career statistics

Club

Notes

References

External links 
 
 ussoccerda.com profile

2004 births
Living people
American soccer players
Association football midfielders
Hartford Athletic players
New York Red Bulls II players
FC Motown players
People from Middletown Township, New Jersey
Soccer players from New Jersey
Sportspeople from Monmouth County, New Jersey
National Premier Soccer League players
USL League Two players
USL Championship players
New York City FC II players
MLS Next Pro players
Duke Blue Devils men's soccer players